Edgewater is a suburb of Perth, Western Australia  north of Perth's central business district. Edgewater was approved as a suburb name in 1974, and its local government area is the City of Joondalup. It is named after its location on the western edge of Lake Joondalup, which is surrounded by Yellagonga Regional Park.

Transport
Edgewater is serviced by the 466 and 465 Transperth bus routes from Joondalup, operated by Swan Transit. Edgewater railway station is located in the far southwest of the suburb.

Geography
Edgewater is bounded by Joondalup Drive to the west, Ocean Reef Road to the south and Yellagonga Regional Park to the east.

Facilities
Edgewater is a residential suburb, with shopping facilities including a supermarket, restaurant, newsagency, chemist, liquor store and barbecue facilities by the lake.

Primary and secondary education 
Edgewater contains one high school, Mater Dei College (a Catholic school), and one primary school, Edgewater Primary School (public).

References

External links
 Edgewater Primary School
 Mater Dei College

Suburbs of Perth, Western Australia
Suburbs in the City of Joondalup